Urbain Andriamampionona (born 10 August 1989) is a Malagasy football defender who currently plays for USS Tamponnaise.

References

1989 births
Living people
Malagasy footballers
Madagascar international footballers
Academie Ny Antsika players
La Tamponnaise players
AS Marsouins players
Association football defenders
Malagasy expatriate footballers
Expatriate footballers in Réunion
Malagasy expatriate sportspeople in Réunion
People from Antananarivo